John Henry Falsey Jr. (November 6, 1951 – January 3, 2019) was an American television writer, director and producer.

Biography
Falsey was born in New Haven, Connecticut, the son of Patricia Helene (née Sisk) and John Henry Falsey. Falsey graduated from Hampshire College with a Bachelor of Arts degree in English in 1975 and earned a Master of Fine Arts in Creative Writing from the Iowa Writers' Workshop at the University of Iowa. In 1979, he joined the production staff of The White Shadow, where he met Joshua Brand.

He co-created St. Elsewhere, I'll Fly Away, and Northern Exposure with Brand. Falsey also wrote and produced Amazing Stories and A Year in the Life. He was nominated for eleven Emmy Awards and won three, as well as the Humanitas Prize, the Producers Guild of America Award, and the Environmental Media Award for Ongoing Commitment.

Falsey died on January 3, 2019, from injuries sustained in a fall.

References

External links

1951 births
2019 deaths
American male screenwriters
American television directors
American television producers
American television writers
Primetime Emmy Award winners
Hampshire College alumni
Writers from New Haven, Connecticut
Showrunners
Iowa Writers' Workshop alumni
American male television writers
Screenwriters from Connecticut